Kokki is a Japanese historical text purported to have been written in 620 by Shōtoku Taishi and Soga no Uma
Kokki

Kokki (film), 2006 film
 Comedy actor of the Netherlands Peppi & Kokki duo
Väinö Kokki, fictional detective from the Finnish comedy films including The Stars Will Tell, Inspector Palmu